The Jaguar E-Pace (X540) is a subcompact luxury crossover SUV (C-segment in Europe) produced by the British car manufacturer Jaguar Land Rover (JLR) under their Jaguar marque. It was officially revealed on 13 July 2017 and was the 2nd production Jaguar SUV.

The car is built in Graz, Austria, by Magna Steyr and from 2018 is also scheduled to be built by Chery Jaguar Land Rover, JLR's joint venture with partner Chery, in Changshu, China.

Overview

Designed under the direction of Jaguar chief designer Ian Callum, the vehicle is based on a modified version of the JLR D8 platform, that's JLR PTA platform, as used by the second incarnation of Range Rover Evoque and the second incarnation of Land Rover Discovery Sport.

The car has a transverse front engine and is available in both front-wheel drive and all-wheel drive versions.

Stunt driver Terry Grant performed a world record barrel roll jump in the car for the reveal which took place at the London ExCel centre. The car did a 270 degree barrel roll and travelled 50 feet (15.3 metres) through the air.

Engines

References

External links

 

E-Pace
Compact sport utility vehicles
Cars introduced in 2017
2020s cars